Woyo masks are ritual masks made by the Woyo people of Central Africa.

Meaning and colors 
The Woyo masks are typically made out of wood, and painted with contrasting colors, often in dots and the colors used had symbolic meaning and were even sometimes repainted, symbolizing rebirth, or to restore the power of the mask. They were worn in ceremonial dances known as the ndunga. They are also decorated with sacred objects known as nkissi.

External links
Information about the Woyo people

References 

Masks in Africa